Olszewko may refer to the following places:
Olszewko, Masovian Voivodeship (east-central Poland)
Olszewko, Kartuzy County in Pomeranian Voivodeship (north Poland)
Olszewko, Słupsk County in Pomeranian Voivodeship (north Poland)
Olszewko, Warmian-Masurian Voivodeship (north Poland)